Mariano Scartezzini (born 7 November 1954) is a retired long-distance runner from Italy, who mainly competed in the men's 3,000 metres Steeplechase event.

He won seven medals, at senior level, at the International athletics competitions.

Biography
He finished in ninth place in this event at the inaugural 1983 World Championships in Helsinki, Finland. He is three-time national champion (1979, 1981 and 1983) in the event. He has 30 caps in national team from 1975 to 1984.

Top 25 lists

National titles
Mariano Scartezzini has won 5 times the individual national championship.
3 wins in the 3000 metres steeplechase (1979, 1981, 1983)
1 win in the 5000 metres (1979)
1 win in the 3000 metres indoor (1983)

See also
 1981 Men's Best Year Performers - 3000 metres steeplechase
 Italian all-time top lists - 3000 metres steeplechase

References

External links
 

1954 births
Living people
Italian male long-distance runners
Italian male steeplechase runners
Place of birth missing (living people)
Mediterranean Games gold medalists for Italy
Athletes (track and field) at the 1979 Mediterranean Games
World Athletics Championships athletes for Italy
Universiade medalists in athletics (track and field)
Mediterranean Games medalists in athletics
Universiade silver medalists for Italy
Universiade bronze medalists for Italy
Medalists at the 1979 Summer Universiade
Medalists at the 1981 Summer Universiade